Fabio Fabene (born 12 March 1959) is an Italian prelate of the Catholic Church who has been the secretary of the Congregation for the Causes of Saints since January 2021. He was under-secretary of the Synod of Bishops from 2014 to 2021. He was consecrated a bishop on 30 May 2014.

Biography

Early life
Fabene studied at the minor seminary in the diocese of Montefiascone. He went on to complete his studies in theology at the Pontifical Regional Seminary in Viterbo and was ordained a priest for the diocese of Montefiascone on 26 May 1984. He was sent to Rome where he earned a doctorate in Canon law (JCD) from the Pontifical Lateran University.

Career
He did pastoral work in the diocese and was later appointed chancellor, serving from 1984 until 1998. After this appointment, he taught canon law. Since 1 January 1998 he entered the service of the Roman Curia serving in the Congregation for Bishops where he went on to become head of office in 2010. Since 1996 he worked as a judge in the marriage tribunal of Lazio for Diocese of Rome.

Pope Francis named him Under-Secretary of the Synod of Bishops on 8 February 2014 and appointed him titular bishop of Acquapendente on 8 April. He was consecrated by Pope Francis on 30 May 2014. In 2017 he was transferred to the titular diocese of Montefiascone.

On 18 January 2021, he was named secretary of the Congregation for the Causes of Saints.

Other
Fabene serves as the postulator in the cause of canonization of Venerable Marcantonio Barbarigo (1640-1706).

References

External links

Living people
1959 births
Pontifical Lateran University alumni
21st-century Italian titular bishops
Bishops appointed by Pope Francis
Officials of the Roman Curia
21st-century Roman Catholic bishops